The Nissan 300ZX is a sports car that was produced across two different generations. As with all other versions of the Z, the 300ZX was sold within the Japanese domestic market under the name Fairlady Z.

It was sold in Japan from 1983 to 2000 and in the United States from 1984 to 1996, the 300ZX name followed the numerical convention initiated with the original Z car, the Nissan S30, which was marketed in the U.S. as the 240Z. The addition of the "X" to the car's name was a carryover from its predecessor, the 280ZX, to signify the presence of more luxury and comfort oriented features. The first generation 300ZX known as the Z31 model was produced from 1983 through 1989 and was a sales success becoming the highest volume Z-car for Nissan.

To become even more competitive in the sports car market, the second generation Z31 was driven up-market. It was redesigned to be faster and feature more advanced technology, but came with a higher price than its predecessor, with consecutive price increases each model year of availability. As such, sales dwindled each year, a trend in the higher end sports car market at the time, and Nissan placed a hiatus on selling new Nissan Z-Cars to the US after the 1996 model year, though the car would continue to be sold in the Japan domestic market until 2001 in low production numbers.

Car and Driver placed the Z32 on its Ten Best list for seven consecutive years, each model year of its availability in the United States. Motor Trend awarded it as the 1990 Import Car of the Year. The Nissan 350Z, officially the Z33 generation Z-Car, succeeded the 300ZX in 2003.

Z31

The Z31 chassis designation was first introduced in Japan on September 16, 1983, as the Fairlady Z. Designed by Kazumasu Takagi and his team of developers, the Z31 improved aerodynamics and increased power when compared to its predecessor, the 280ZX. The newer Z-car had a drag coefficient of 0.30 and was powered by Japan's first mass-produced V6 engine instead of the inline-sixes of the previous Z-cars. According to Nissan, the new V6 engine was intended to uphold the sporty, six-cylinder spirit of the original Fairlady Z, but in a more compact and efficient package.

Unlike its predecessors, the Z31 featured a V6 engine in the 200Z/ZS/ZG, 300ZX and 300ZR, and the only Z31 to come with an inline-six cylinder engine was the Fairlady 200ZR which was only available in Japan. The 200ZR was the last Z-car to feature a factory-installed inline six, with roughly 8,283 produced between 1985 and 1988. They came in two trims; 200ZR-I (base model with the 'slicktop roof,' few amenities, and only in manual), and 200ZR-II (t-top roof, more electronic options, and available with an optional automatic transmission). 200ZR models also came standard with the R200 limited slip differential, white faced gauges, and ZR specific cloth upholstery.  There were five engine options in total: A turbocharged dual overhead cam 2.0 L straight-six (RB20DET (NICS), used in the 200ZR), a turbocharged single overhead cam 2.0 L V6 (VG20ET, found in the Japanese domestic market 200Z/ZS/ZG), a naturally aspirated single overhead cam 3.0 L V6 (VG30E, found in 300ZX), a turbocharged single overhead cam 3.0 L V6 (VG30ET, used in 300ZX Turbo) and a naturally aspirated dual overhead cam 3.0 L V6 (VG30DE, used in 300ZR). The Z31 had electronic fuel injection (EFI), and was rear wheel drive. The VG30 engine was either a type A or type B sub-designation from 1984 to March 1987, while models from April 1987 to 1989 had a W sub-designation. The W-series engines featured redesigned water jackets for additional cooling, and fully floating piston wrist pins. Finally, these engines were equipped with self-adjusting hydraulic valve lifters.

The transmissions were a 5-speed manual or an optional 4-speed automatic (all Z31 automatics were the E4N71B equipped with torque-converter lockup including turbo models). All Z31s were equipped with a Nissan R200 rear differential, April 1987 and later turbo models received an R200 clutch limited-slip differential except 1988 Shiro Specials which had a Viscous-type limited slip.

As with some other Nissan models of the period, the new Z31s were equipped with a "Voice Warning System". The Voice Warning System used the vehicle's radio and driver's door speaker to mute the radio and provide a vocal warning whenever the left or right door was ajar, the exterior lights were left on after the vehicle was turned off, parking brake was left on while trying to operate the car, or the fuel level was low. This system was dropped for the 1987 model year.

Other technological features in the 300ZX included a "Body Sonic" audio system that utilized a separate amplifier and speakers in the vehicle's front seats that allowed bass from music to be felt by the vehicle's occupants, analog gauges, stereo and climate control, or an optional digital gauge cluster, digital stereo with equalizer and an optional fully digital climate control system.

Chassis
The Z31 chassis was based on the 280ZX. Although the newer chassis had the same wheelbase and MacPherson strut/semi-trailing arm independent suspension, it handled and accelerated better than the 280ZX it replaced. Turbocharged models, except for the Shiro Special edition, had 3-way electronically adjustable shock absorbers. The Z31 was available in either left or right hand drive.

Style and evolution
The Z31 body was slightly restyled in 1986 with the addition of side skirts, flared fenders, and sixteen inch wheels (turbo models only). Many black plastic trim pieces were also painted to match the body color, and the hood scoop was removed. The car was given a final makeover in 1987 that included more aerodynamic bumpers, fog lamps within the front air dam, and 9004 bulb-based headlamps that replaced the outdated sealed beam headlights. The 300ZX-titled reflector in the rear was updated to a narrow set of tail lights running the entire width of the car and an LED third brake light on top of the rear hatch. This was the first car in history to have the central brake light with LED, in 1987 model year, made by Stanley Electric. The Z31 continued selling until 1989, more than any other Z-Car at the time. Cars produced from 1984 to 1985 are referred to as "Zenki" or "Zenki-gata" models, while cars produced from 1987 to 1989 are known as "Kouki" or "Kouki-gata" models. The 1986 models are unique due to sharing some major features from both. They are sometimes referred to as "Chuki" models, but are usually grouped with the Zenki models because of the head and tail lights.

North American market
North America was the main market for the 300ZX, as for previous generations of the Z-car. It was introduced to the United States in October 1983, along with the remainder of Nissan's 1984 model year lineup. By now the "Datsun" nameplate had been completely retired in North America. Over 70,000 units were sold in North America in 1985 alone. There were three trim models available: SF, GL, and GLL. The SF model was only available in Canada. The new V6 (2960 cc) Single overhead cam engine was available as a naturally aspirated VG30E or a turbocharged VG30ET producing  and  respectively. The 1984 to 1987 turbo models featured a Garrett T3 turbocharger with a 7.8:1 compression ratio, whereas 1988 to 1989 models featured a low inertia T25 turbocharger with an increased 8.3:1 compression ratio and slightly more power —  naturally aspirated and  turbocharged.

For the 1986 model year, the base two-seater model was made available without the T-bars, creating a lower cost entry-level version.

Special editions

Two Special Edition versions of the Z31 generation model were produced by Nissan; a 50th Anniversary Edition celebrated the company's semi-centennial in 1984 and offered additional luxury features, and a "Shiro Special", released four years later, with performance-oriented upgrades.

The 1984 300ZX 50th Anniversary Edition, released to celebrate the automaker's half-century, was a turbocharged coupé (two-seater) model with a Silver/Black color scheme. All 50th Anniversary Editions came equipped with a digital dash and ancillary gauges including average mileage, G-force, and compass readouts, in-car electronic adjustable shocks, Bodysonic speakers in the seats, cruise and radio controls in the steering wheel, mirrored t-tops, embroidered leather seats, embroidered floor mats, sixteen-inch (406 mm) aluminum wheels, rear fender flares, flared front fenders, a 50th AE logo badge on the driver's side front fender, and grey cloth indoor car cover with 50AE printing. The only option available to the 50th Anniversary Edition was the choice between an automatic or a 5-speed manual transmission. 5,148 AE models were produced for the U.S. market and 300 for the Canadian market. A non-turbo 2+2 model was also available with 50AE badging in the Australian market.

In 1988, the turbocharged Shiro Special debuted with pearl white paint, stiffer springs and matched shocks, heavy-duty anti-sway bars, a unique front air dam, paint matched wheels, Recaro seats with matching door panels, painted bumperettes, white painted door handles and a viscous limited-slip differential. No options were available for the Shiro. It was the fastest car out of Japan, capable of  speeds, as tested by Motor Trend with the electronic speed limiter disabled. A total of 1,002 Shiro Special Z31s were produced for the U.S. market between January and March 1988.

Japanese market
In Japan, the Z31 was marketed as the Fairlady Z and was originally only available with two turbocharged engines: the  VG20ET in the regular Fairlady Z and the  VG30ET in the Fairlady Z 300ZX. Both outputs are JIS Gross and both engines use the Garrett AiResearch T03 turbocharger. Japanese 300ZX buyers were liable for additional yearly taxes that affected sales. As originally introduced, all Japanese market Fairlady Z's were slicktops, but the T-top option was made available in February 1984.

The 2-liter models later gained the 200Z, 200ZG, or 200ZS monikers to help differentiate from the larger, three-liter models. They all used the VG20ET engine while the 200ZR came with the RB20DET. The 300ZX came with the VG30ET, with similar specifications to the USDM model. The only Fairlady Z variant to use the VG30DE engine, and the only Japanese-market model with a naturally aspirated engine, was the 300ZR. It continued to be marketed as a companion fastback to the more formal appearance of the Nissan Skyline-based Nissan Leopard coupé at Nissan Bluebird Store Japanese dealerships.

The 200ZR model was introduced in October 1985 and was the first production car in the world to use a ceramic turbocharger. Maximum power output is  Net. The 200ZR was offered on both wheelbases and as a slicktop (200ZR-I) or as a T-top (200ZR-II). 1986 model year 200ZR's feature a prominent central hood scoop. This was made much smaller with the October 1986 facelift, which generally made for a smoother appearance overall. The 300ZR was positioned as a sportier alternative, with tighter suspension settings, while the turbocharged 300ZX was now only offered with an automatic transmission, and the 200ZR was a budget alternative as it fit into a lower tax and insurance category thanks to its smaller engine.

European models
The European turbo models, as well as those sold in other markets unencumbered by strict emissions regulations, produce  due to higher lift and higher duration on the camshaft profile, also known outside of Europe as the Nismo camshafts. The two-seater model was not available in mainland Europe but was available in the United Kingdom. Some models were also equipped without catalytic converters. All European turbocharged models received a different front lower spoiler as well, with 84-86 models being unique and 87-89 production having the same spoiler as the USDM 1988 Shiro Special model.

Swedish- and Swiss-market models (as well as those sold in Australia) received exhaust gas recirculation control systems to meet those countries particular emissions regulations.

Australian models
All Australian model Z31 300ZXs were 2+2 T-top body, with an engine offering of either the 3.0L V6 N/A VG30E, or the 3.0L V6 Turbo Charged VG30ET. The cars sold in 1984 and '85 were all naturally aspirated with no catalytic converter, while the turbocharged version was the only model available from 1986 to 1988. There was only one trim level in Australia, with the digital dashboard and climate control being an optional upgrade package, and leather seats only available in the redesigned series 3 "Californian" models. The Australian factory service manual provides camshaft measurements which do not match any of the known USDM or EDM camshaft profiles, the FSM states the exhaust valve has an open duration of 252 degrees, but the specified opening and closing angles add up to 258 degrees. The Australian 50th Anniversary Edition was more basic than the U.S. version, the 50th AE was a normal n/a 300ZX with the digital dash package, a black interior, black velour seats, and a 50th AE badge on the exterior. The exterior badge was fixed to the cars by dealerships, so the position of the badge is not the same on all models. There was no Shiro Special in Australia, and no models featured the adjustable shock absorbers.

Z32

The Z32 was a new design, approved in final form by Nissan management on October 1, 1986 and designed by Isao Sono and Toshio Yamashita. The body was wider with a rounder profile and fewer hard edges. It had a marginally increased drag coefficient of .31 compared to the Z31's .30. The Z32 was the first car to be marketed following the introduction of the  power ceiling imposed by JAMA that remained until 2004. Twin Turbocharged Z32s also featured adjustable two mode suspension and the four-wheel steering systems called "Super HICAS" (High Capacity Actively Controlled Steering), first introduced on the R31 Nissan Skyline. Nissan utilized the Cray-2 supercomputer to design the new Z32 with a form of CAD software making it one of the first production cars to utilize this tool.

Like previous generations, Nissan offered a 4-seater (2+2) model with the Z32. Most Z32s now featured T-tops as standard. A hardtop (Slicktop) model was available in North America, only in Naturally Aspirated guise, and in Japan was available as Naturally Aspirated as well as an extremely rare Twin Turbo model (Japan-only). All “Slicktops” were 2 seaters (2+0). In 1992, a 2-seat convertible version (produced by ASC) was introduced for the first time, in response to aftermarket conversions.

In 1990, Motorsports International of Waco, Texas collaborated with Japanese tuning company HKS to create the SR-71 Z32. The cars were upgraded with larger Garrett turbochargers, HKS electronics and a Kaminari body kit designed for the SR-71 by Pete Brock. The SR-71 was California CARB certified and was to be sold through a select dealer network and Japanese performance tuning shops located within the United States. It was planned to build 500 cars per year through 1993. One hundred orders were already in hand. The exact number is not known. The SR-71 claimed the title of the third fastest production car in the world in 1990 for a fraction of the price of a Lamborghini Diablo and Ferrari F40 according to the designer Randy Ball. The base price was $65,000 for the Z32 and SR-71 conversion.

In 1995 and 1996, Steve Millen Motorsports (Stillen), developed a SMZ model with Nissan North America that were sold throughout the U.S. and Canada through designated Nissan dealerships. The performance upgrades were covered by the factory warranty. These performance upgrades included: Skyline Group N/GT-R Brakes, which were cross drilled and axially vented rotors with larger calipers and pistons and upgraded HI-Metal front and rear brake pads; a high flow intake system, which added horsepower and allowed the engine to run more efficiently; an aluminized steel free flow exhaust system, which extended from the catalytic converter and increased rear wheel horsepower; and a turbocharger boost pressure increase, bringing the total increase to 365 brake horsepower. Each vehicle was numbered in the engine bay and interior. A total of 104 SMZs were produced at $14,000 more than the standard Nissan Z32 Twin Turbo.

American Z-car sales reached one million sales during the 1990 model year, making it at that time the best selling sports car. In America the 300ZX faced the same fate of many Japanese sports cars of the time. While the 1989 300ZX was priced at around $30,000, its final model year price increased to about $50,000. The mid-1990s marketplace trends toward SUVs and the rising Yen:Dollar ratio contributed to the end of North American 300ZX sales in 1996 with over 80,000 in sales. A Commemorative Edition for the final 300 units shipped to America included decals and certificates of authenticity.

In the UK & Europe, all Z32s offered were in 2+2 TT form between 1990 and 1996 (1990-1994 for UK). They were sold through dealerships in the UK, France, Germany, Belgium and Italy.

In Australia, all Z32s offered were in 2+2 NA form between 1990 to 1995.

In Japan, the 300ZX continued until August 2000. The Japanese Domestic Market was offered a number of variants unavailable to the international market such as the "Version S" (Spec Model), “Version R” (Ready Model) and Slicktop Twin Turbo (the most expensive trim option only available in Version S guise).

Version S was a base grade specification that includes all necessary road trim and items as standard, such as stereo and A/C. It could be ordered with various options separately. Options were available separately by order only, and include:

• 2+0 SWB 2-Seater T-Top trim
• 2+0 SWB 2-Seater solid roof (slicktop) trim
• 2+2 LWB 4-Seater T-Top trim
• Automatic Climate Control
• Cruise Control
• 8 Way Power Drivers Seat
• 4 Way Power Passengers Seat 
• Recaro Seats
• BOSE Audio
• VG30DE Naturally Aspirated Engine
• VG30DETT Twin Turbo Engine
• Super HICAS (only available on TT option)
• Anti-Lock Brake System
• Drivers Side Airbag
• Suede / Tweed / Cloth / Leather Seating
• All other available “Altia” options from order guide

Version R:

Available only on 2+2 LWB 4-Seater with the only major options being in N/A or Twin Turbo configuration, with automatic or manual transmissions, this trim came with preset options from the factory at a reduced (combined) cost, giving customers a “ready” model by which to order if they didn’t feel like ordering options one by one. This presented buyers with an easier choice selection and a “base model” car by which to settle for.

Standard features (for 1998) included:

• Recaro Seats
• Sideskirts
• Rear Spoiler
• Drivers Side Airbag
• Cloth Seats
• Anti-Lock Brakes
• Xenon HID Headlamps
• Cruise Control
• Automatic Climate Control

The only options were:

• Carbon / Marble Interior Trim
• Audio Equipment Package with EQ.
• Automatic or Manual Transmission
• VG30DE or VG30DETT

The aforementioned facelift of late 1998 featured a new front fascia, tail lights, optional Xenon HID headlights, optional rear spoiler, optional BBS mesh wheels, orange rear corner lights and an instrument cluster with white dials as well as other minor changes.

Early model Z32s (made pre-1994) and sold in Japan did not have Exhaust Gas Recirculation systems nor Air Injection Valve systems. All JDM Z32s used a front rebar system made out of fiberglass rather than steel (like their American Market counterparts), and also had different exhaust systems with lighter weight Catalytic Converters (with only one set on the JDM Twin Turbo model vs. two sets on the USDM Twin Turbo models). Given the lack of these regulatory items, JDM Z32s often weighed 100+lbs (45+kg) less than their American specification counterparts.

Style and evolution
The Z32 chassis underwent some changes during its production run between 1989 and 2000 (Japan) and 1990 to 1996 (US). The Z32’s extended model year sales in 1990 reached 39,290 units.

1991
 Manual climate controls discontinued (except convertible models)
 New electronic climate controls allowed control over air flow direction, but the ambient temperature gauge was discontinued
 Air conditioner evaporator valve changed from aluminum to steel to reduce noise
 Driver's airbag available as an option
 CD player option was added for both the TT and NA (previously only available in the NA), while the Bose stereo head unit changed
 Front brake rotors on NA models were changed to TT units (previous front rotors were 4 mm thinner)
 Brake master cylinder was changed to a new unit (February 1991)
 Nissan logo appears on front nose panel instead of a decal on the front fascia
 Hardtop coupe available mid-year (NA only)
 Floor mat logo changed from "300ZX" to "Z"
 Keyhole on driver's door and interior light illuminates green when door handle is pulled (similar to Z31)
 US Sales: 17,652 units

1992
 Driver's airbag made standard
 Dashboard and door complementary material changed from fabric to suede
 Separate mirror heater switch eliminated (combined with rear defroster switch)
 Power adjustable driver's seat standard on T-top models
 Mirror heaters made standard, and are activated with front windshield defrost button
 US Sales: 6,708 units

1993
 Turbo oil line insulation changed
 Convertible option added
 Brake caliper material changed from aluminum to iron
 New style fuel injectors for the non-turbo, (except convertible)
 Upgraded Bose stereo made standard
 Air injection valve (AIV) system eliminated
 Non-turbo model, (except convertible), ECUs changed from 8-bit to 16-bit by Japan Electronic Control System Co.
 US Sales: 11,599 units

1994
 Rear spoiler design changed to a taller, pedestal-type
 Seat belts redesigned; attachment points moved from door mounts to pillar mounts
 Super HICAS system changed from hydraulic to electrical actuation (previously power steering actuated)
 New style fuel injectors for the convertible
 Passenger's side airbag introduced and made standard
 Keyless entry added
 Titanium keys discontinued in November 1994
 'Reset' button removed from clock
 Off-white 'Pearl' color is dropped. Future 'Pearls' are more of a semi-metallic white
 US Sales: 5,320 units

1995
 New style fuel injectors for the twin-turbo (Less prone to failure from modern ethanol blended gasoline)
 Front fascia became body colored instead of gray strip
 Twin-turbo model ECUs changed from 8-bit to 16-bit (in late-1994 model year)
 Special 25th Anniversary gold paint available
 Version S trim level made available (Japan only)
 16" BBS mesh wheels made available as an option (Japan only)
 US Sales: 3,135 units

1996
 Variable cam timing (NVTC) dropped due to emission regulations
 OBD II electronics introduced
 Driver's seat back rest no longer included adjustable side bolsters
 Sales: 2929 units - the last 300 of which are the "Commemorative Edition"

MY1997-1998 (Japan only)

 Twin-turbo front fascia adopted by all models, presumably to lower production costs
 Lift-style window switches
 Version R trim level made available
 T-top option dropped from 2+0 models
 Automatic transmission option dropped from 2+0 models

MY1999-2000 (Japan only)

 Convertible chassis dropped
 Revised manual transmission using stronger synchronizers to combat a common "soft-synchro" problem that had become apparent on earlier Z32s.
Instrument cluster with white dials
New front fascia
Xenon HID headlights
New taillights (featuring clear turn signal lenses, chrome housings and black pinstriping)
New taillight centre panel ("300ZX" lettering in red instead of silver)
New rear spoiler (standard on TT models, option for NA models)
New side-skirts (Version R only)
Door locking mechanism of convertible adopted (all models)
Steering member bracket and support stay of convertible added to 2+2 models
Thickness of floor panels and structural members increased for greater rigidity (all models)
Large central cross member added for greater rigidity (Version R only)

Advertising
Nissan aired a commercial during Super Bowl XXIV in 1990 advertising the new Nissan 300ZX Twin Turbo. The 60-second commercial was directed by Ridley Scott and only aired once. Executives at Nissan pulled the commercial after the initial airing when they became concerned the commercial would promote street racing since the commercial features the 300ZX being faster than a sport bike, a Formula One car and a fighter jet. 

Another memorable 300ZX commercial is "Toys" from 1996. Inspired by the film Toy Story, the commercial is set to Van Halen's cover of "You Really Got Me" and depicts a G. I. Joe-like action figure coming to life, getting behind the wheel of a red 300ZX radio-controlled car and picking up a Barbie-like doll for a date, stealing her away from her husband, who resembles Ken. They then drive around the feet of Mr K, a caricature of former Nissan executive Yutaka Katayama acted by Dale Ishimoto, who smiles as he watches them go by. Toy manufacturer Mattel filed a lawsuit against Nissan in 1997, claiming the ad's use of dolls that resemble G. I. Joe, Barbie and Ken amounted to "trademark and copyright infringement" and caused "irreparable injury to Mattel's name, business reputation and goodwill." Mattel sought unspecified damages and an injunction that would pull the ad off the air. Nissan defended the ad, claiming that the dolls were named "Roxanne", "Nick" and "Tad" and that they were modeled after celebrities. Mattel and Nissan eventually settled the lawsuit out of court and observers noted that the lawsuit ultimately just gave Nissan and the advertisement further exposure and publicity.

Motorsports

The 300ZX was campaigned during 1984 and 1985 in showroom stock racing. The car scored a Trans Am win in 1986 at Lime Rock by Paul Newman for Bob Sharp Racing. This would be the only Trans Am win by a 300ZX.

From 1985 to 1987, the Electramotive-developed GTP ZX-Turbo was raced in the IMSA GT Championship's GTP class and also the All Japan Sports Prototype Championship, badged as a Fairlady Z, using a Lola T810 chassis and a VG30ET engine. Following development through 1987, the car would become dominant in IMSA GT in 1988. Additional factory endorsement, combined with a new chassis, transmission and more reliable Goodyear tires contributed to the team's success.

From 1990 to 1995, Steve Millen drove the twin turbo 300ZX for Clayton Cunningham Racing. The car dominated the IMSA in its GTO, then later GTS categories due to its newly designed chassis and engine. Millen would rank as the #1 Factory Driver for Nissan for 7 years and earn two IMSA GTS Driving Championships and two IMSA GTS Manufacturer's Championships. The biggest triumph for the Z32 racecar was the victory in the 1994 24 Hours of Daytona. In the 1994 24 Hours of Le Mans, the 300ZX ranked first in the GTS-1 class and 5th overall. In an attempt to level the playing field in the GTS-1 class by reducing the allowable horsepower, the IMSA declared the twin turbo VG engine ineligible for the 1995 season. The 1995 GTS 300ZX car would debut with the V8 Nissan VH engine at Daytona and would place first in the GTS-1 class at the 12 Hours of Sebring and Moosehead Grand Prix in Halifax.

The JUN-BLITZ Bonneville Z32 holds the E/BMS class land speed record of 260.87 mph (419.84 km/h) set at the 1995 Bonneville Speed Trial. The vehicle was built as a partnership between JUN Auto and BLITZ. In 1990, JUN's first Z32 went 210.78 mph (339.2 km/h) at their Yatabe test course and hit 231.78 mph (373 km/h) after some tuning at Bonneville.

Awards and recognition

 1990: The 1990 300ZX Turbo is named Motor Trend's "Import Car of the Year". Motor Trend also names it, "One of the Top Ten Performance Cars". Automobile magazine named the 300ZX Turbo to its "All Stars" list. Road & Track picked the 300ZX Turbo as "One of the Ten Best Cars in the World". Car and Driver included the 300ZX Turbo in their list "One of the 10 Best Cars"
 1991: The 300ZX Turbo is listed in Car and Driver's 10Best, and is again one of Automobile magazine's "All-Stars"
 1992: Car and Driver includes the 300ZX Turbo in its "10 Best", and Automobile magazine names it to its "All-Stars" list
 1993: The 300ZX Turbo is included in Car and Driver's 10Best, and one of Automobile magazine's "All-Stars".
 1994: The 300ZX Turbo is listed on the Car and Driver's 10Best and on the "All Stars" list by Automobile magazine
 1995: The 300ZX Turbo is included in the "10 Best" list by Car and Driver
 1996: For the seventh straight year the 300ZX Turbo is on Car and Driver's 10Best list, this is also the final year of U.S. sales
 2004: Automobile lists the Z32 as one of the 100 greatest cars of all time
 2006: Automobile lists the Z32 on both the "20 Greatest Cars of the Past 20 years" and the "25 Most Beautiful Cars in History"
 2010: GQ Magazine lists the Z32 as one of the most stylish cars over the past 50 years

From the year it was introduced, the Z32 has also won many comparison tests against similar sports cars such as the Mitsubishi 3000GT/Dodge Stealth, Mazda RX-7, Chevrolet Corvette, Toyota Supra, Dodge Viper, and the Porsche 968.

Safety
In Australia, the 1990 to 1995 Nissan 300ZX was assessed in the Used Car Safety Ratings brochure as providing "average" protection for its occupants in the event of a crash.

In the US, the National Highway Traffic Safety Administration (NHTSA) gave the 1991-1993 300ZX 3 out of 5 stars in front driver collision crash test ratings.

Notes

Bibliography

External links

 Nissan USA: Inside Nissan - Heritage

300ZX
Rear-wheel-drive vehicles
Convertibles
Hatchbacks
Vehicles with four-wheel steering
1990s cars
Sports cars
2+2 coupés
Cars introduced in 1983
Cars discontinued in 2000